Michael Frederic Howard (born April 2, 1958) is a former Major League Baseball player for the New York Mets.

He was drafted by the Los Angeles Dodgers in the 6th round of the 1976 MLB Draft and then selected by the Mets from the Dodgers in the 1978 Rule V Draft. Howard broke into the big leagues at age 23, making his debut on September 12, 1981.  His final major league game was played on April 5, 1983 - opening day. Howard singled off of future Hall of Famer Steve Carlton with the bases loaded in a scoreless game, earning the game winning RBI. He did not get another appearance before being sent down to the minors later that month, and never made it back to the major leagues.

References

Sources 

 Mike Howard profile provided by baseball-almanac.com

1958 births
Living people
New York Mets players
Major League Baseball left fielders
Major League Baseball right fielders
Baseball players from Seattle
Bellingham Dodgers players
Lethbridge Dodgers players
Lodi Dodgers players
Clinton Dodgers players
Jackson Mets players
Tidewater Tides players
Gulf Coast Mets players
Hawaii Islanders players